MEDICA Trade Fair, the World Forum for Medicine - International Exhibition and Conference, which takes place annually in Düsseldorf was established in 1969. It claims to be the world’s largest event for the medical sector.  It is a part of MEDICAlliance which provides conferences, a magazine, a weekly newsletter and other resources worldwide. 

Christian Grosser is the director of the MEDICA and COMPAMED trade fairs and coordinates Messe Düsseldorf's worldwide medical trade fair activities. 

The 2022 exhibition, 14 – 17 November 2022, has 5,600 exhibitors from more than 50 countries in 17 halls. It has exhibitors from lab technology and diagnostics, electrotherapy and medical technology, disposables and consumables, information, and communication technology (digital health) and physiotherapy and orthopaedic technology.  The Association of British HealthTech Industries and the Department for International Trade have organised a British presence for several years.    Artificial intelligence, digital twins, augmented reality, 5G connectivity and virtual reality are significant focuses of the exhibition.  The Department for International Trade has organised the UK Government's pavilion to showcase the strengths of UK healthtech, innovation and research and the DIT Scotland team will also be present.

References

Trade fairs in Germany
1969 establishments in Germany
Recurring events established in 1969
Events in Düsseldorf